Satya Pir is a belief system found in Bengal created by the fusion of Islam and local religions. Experts maintain that the Muslim Satya Pir and the Hindu Satyanarayan Puja essentially represent the same beliefs and rituals.
A century ago in Bengal, the ritual called, pujah was mainly performed by Hindu women and was interchangeably called Satya pir Pujah or Satya Narayan pujah.

According to the author, Dwijendra Nath Neogi, some  Muslims  at that time also performed the pujah. The author gives alternate theories as to how Pir and Narayan got associated. In one theory, he proposes that Brahmins during the Islamic era  in Bengal changed Narayan into Pir in order for the Muslims to believe that they were worshipping an Islamic saint. The other theory says the worship started as that of a Muslim saint or Pir and later the Pir was changed into Narayan. 

In folklores, Narayan and Pir get mixed such as one supplicant will address him as Satya Narayana, implying that he is an avatar of Krishna, while another one in a different tale will be told that Satya Pir has just come from Mecca, which would make him Muslim.

In Orissa, the state adjacent to Bengal,  Sufism gained popularity and led to the emergence of the Satya-Pir tradition. Even today Hindus worship Satyanarayan and pir together.

Satya pir is worshipped by some Buddhists in Bangladesh.

References

Bengali culture
Religion in Bangladesh
Hindu traditions

Further reading 

 Stewart, Tony (2003). Fabulous Females and Peerless Pirs: Tales of Mad Adventure in Old Bengal. Oxford University Press.